The Max & Moritz Prize  is a prize for comic books, comic strips, and other similar materials which has been awarded at each of the biennial International Comics Shows of Erlangen since 1984. It is open to all material published in Germany.

1984 
 Best German-language Comic Artist: 
 Best Comic Strip: Hägar the Horrible, by Dik Browne
 Best German-language Comic/Comic-related Publication: Edition Comic Art (series) (Carlsen Verlag)

1986 
 Best German-language Comic Artist: Matthias Schultheiss
 Best Comic Strip: Animal Crackers by Rog Bollen
 Best German-language Comic/Comic-related Publication:
 Macao - Internationale Comics (Macao Books, Wuppertal)
  Comic Art Magazine (Zürich, Munich)
 Coeurs de sable, by Jacques de Loustal & 
 Peter and the Wolf, by Jörg Müller & Loriot

1988 
 Best German-language Comic Artist: Franziska Becker
 Best Comic Strip: Mafalda, by Quino

1990 
 Best German-language Comic Artist: Gerhard Seyfried
 Best Comic Strip: Calvin and Hobbes, by Bill Watterson
 Best German-language Comic/Comic-related Publication:
 , by Miguelanxo Prado (Egmont Ehapa)
 Watchmen, by Alan Moore & Dave Gibbons (Carlsen Verlag)
 Volumes of Tardi's work
 Boxer Comic Art Magazine (Edition Kunst der Comics)
 Special Prize: Art Spiegelman, for Maus

1992 
 Best German-language Comic Artist: Ralf König
 Best Comic Strip: B.C., by Johnny Hart
 Best German-language Comic/Comic-related Publication:
 Peter Pan, by Régis Loisel (Egmont Ehapa)
 Théodore Poussin, by Frank Le Gall (Carlsen Verlag)
  Les pionniers de l'aventure humaine, by François Boucq
 Die Bibliothek der großen Comic-Klassiker (series) (Carlsen Verlag)
 Fires, by Lorenzo Mattotti (Edition Kunst der Comics)
 Special Prize for outstanding life's work: Alberto Breccia

1993 (in Hamburg) 
 Best German-language Comic Artist: Walter Moers
 Best Comic Strip or Cartoon Series: The Far Side, by Gary Larson
 Best German-language Comic/Comic-related Publication:
 Domestic: Es ist ein Arschloch, Maria!, by Walter Moers
 Import: L'Uomo alla Finestra, by Lorenzo Mattotti & Lilia Ambrosi (Edition Kunst der Comics)
 For Children and Young People: Jimmy Boy, by Dominique David (Carlsen Verlag)
 Publication About Comics: Entretiens avec Moebius, by Numa Sadoul (Carlsen Verlag)
 Self-published Comic: Artige Zeiten, by 
 Special Prize for outstanding life's work: Carl Barks

1994 
 Best German-language Comic Artist: 
 Best Comic Strip or Cartoon Series: Captain Star, by Steven Appleby
 Best German-language Comic/Comic-related Publication:
 Import: Foligatto, by Nicolas de Crécy & Alexios Tjoyas (Egmont Ehapa)
 Import: Jeux pour mourir, by Jacques Tardi
 Import: Red Road, by Derib (Carlsen Verlag)
 For Children and Young People: Full Moon Soup, by Alastair Graham (Bertelsmann Verlag)
 Best International Writer: Jean van Hamme
 Special Prize of the Jury: Mecki - Einer für alle, by 
 Special Prize for outstanding life's work: Will Eisner

1996 
 Best German-language Comic Artist: Thomas Ott
 Best Comic Strip or Cartoon Series: Mutts, by Patrick McDonnell
 Best German-language Comic/Comic-related Publication:
 Domestic: Lovecraft, by Reinhard Kleist &  (Egmont Ehapa)
 Import: Saint-Exupéry - le dernier vol, by Hugo Pratt (Egmont Ehapa)
 Import: Zoo, by Frank Pé & 
 Publication About Comics: 100 Jahre Comic Strips, by Bill Blackbeard, et al. (Carlsen Verlag) 
 Best International Writer: Pierre Christin
 Special Prize of the Jury: Dietmar Hahlweg, prior mayor of the city of Erlangen
 Special Prize for outstanding life's work: André Franquin

1998 
 Best German-language Comic Artist: 
 Best Comic Strip or Cartoon Series: Dilbert, by Scott Adams
 Best German-language Comic/Comic-related Publication:
 Domestic: Wüttner, by 
 Import: City of Glass, by David Mazzucchelli & Paul Karasik (Rowohlt Verlag)
 for Children and Young People: Illustrierte Kinderklassiker (series) (Egmont Ehapa)
 Best International Writer: Neil Gaiman
 Special Prize of the Jury: Le Guide des cités, by François Schuiten & Benoît Peeters (Egmont Ehapa)
 Special Prize for outstanding life's work: Robert Crumb

2000 
 Best German-language Comic Artist: 
 Best Comic Strip or Cartoon Series:
 International: Zits, by Jerry Scott and Jim Borgman
 Domestic: Touché, by ©TOM
 Best German-language Comic/Comic-related Publication:
 Domestic: Geteilter Traum, by Daniel Bosshart
 Import: Approximate Continuum Comics, by Lewis Trondheim
 Publication About Comics: Die deutschsprachige Comic-Fachpresse, by 
 Best International Writer: Alan Moore
 Special Prize of the Jury: The Long and Unlearned Life of Roland Gethers, by Shane Simmons
 Special Prize for outstanding life's work: Moebius/Jean Giraud

2002 
 Best German-language Comic Artist: 
 Best Comic Strip or Cartoon Series:
 International: Liberty Meadows, by Frank Cho
 Domestic: Perscheids Abgründe, by Martin Perscheid
 Best German-language Comic/Comic-related Publication:
 Domestic: Moga Mobo - 100 Meisterwerke der Weltliteratur
 Import: Lost Girl, by Nabiel Kanan (Lost Comix)
 For Young People: Come la vita - Cuori imbranati, by Carlos Trillo &  (Edition Schwarzer Klecks)
 Publication About Comics: Lexikon der Comics, by Marcus Czerwionka (ed.) (Corian-Verlag)
 Best International Writer: Frank Giroud
 Special Prize of the Jury: Karl Manfred Fischer, creator & director of the Erlangen Comics Show
 Special Prize for outstanding life's work: José Muñoz

2004 
 Best German-language Comic Artist: 
 Best Comic Strip: , by 
 Best German-language Comic/Comic-related Publication:
 Domestic: Held, by Flix (Carlsen Verlag)
 Domestic: Leviathan, by 
 Import: Persepolis, by Marjane Satrapi
 For Children and Young People: W.I.T.C.H., by Elisabetta Gnone, et al. (Egmont Ehapa)
 Best International Writer: Joann Sfar
 Special Prize of the Jury: 36 vues de la Tour Eiffel, by André Juillard
 Special Prize for outstanding life's work: Albert Uderzo

2006 
 Best German-language Comic Artist: 
 Best Comic Strip: Doonesbury, by Garry Trudeau
 Best German-language Comic/Comic-related Publication:
 Domestic: Das Unbehagen, by Nicolas Mahler
 Import: Gli Innocenti, by Gipi (avant-verlag)
 Manga: Barefoot Gen, by Keiji Nakazawa (Carlsen Verlag)
 For Children and Young People: Jónas Blondal, by Jens F. Ehrenreich (Epsilon Verlag)
 Best International Writer: Max Goldt
 Special Prize of the Jury: Ralf König, for his cartoons and commitment to the conflict revolving around the Danish Mohammed cartoons.
 Special Prize for outstanding life's work: Jacques Tardi

2008 
 Best German-language Comic Artist: Anke Feuchtenberger
 Best Comic Strip: Flaschko – Der Mann in der Heizdecke, by Nicolas Mahler
 Best German-language Comic/Comic-related Publication:
 Domestic: Cash – I see a darkness, by Reinhard Kleist (Carlsen Verlag)
 Import: Epileptic, by David B.
 Manga: A Distant Neighborhood, by Jiro Taniguchi (Carlsen Verlag)
 For Children and Young People: Der 35. Mai, by 
 Art school project: Plusplus
 Best International Writer: 
 Special Prizes of the Jury:
 Hannes Hegen
 Hansrudi Wäscher
 Special Prize for outstanding life's work: Alan Moore

2010 
 Best German-language Comic Artist: Nicolas Mahler
 Best Comic Strip: Prototyp and Archetyp, by Ralf König
 Best German-language Comic/Comic-related Publication:
 Domestic: Alpha.
 Import: Pinocchio, by Winshluss (avant-verlag)
 Art school project: Strichnin
 Prize Awarded by the Audience: Today is the Last Day of the Rest of Your Life, by Ulli Lust (avant-verlag)
 Special Prize of the Jury: German Edition of Will Eisner's A Contract with God (Carlsen Verlag) and The Spirit
 Special Prize for outstanding life's work: Pierre Christin

2012 
 Best German-language Comic Artist: 
 Best Comic Strip: Schöne Töchter, by Flix
 Best German-language Comic/Comic-related Publication:
 Domestic: Packeis, by Simon Schwartz (avant-verlag)
 Import: Footnotes in Gaza, by Joe Sacco
 For Children and Young People: Boucle d'or et les Sept Ours nains, by Émile Bravo (Carlsen Verlag)
 Art school project: Ampel Magazin
 Prize Awarded by the Audience: Grablicht, by Daniela Winkler (Droemer Knaur)
 Special Prize of the Jury: Rossi Schreiber
 Special Prize for outstanding life's work: Lorenzo Mattotti

2014 
 Best German-language Comic Artist: Ulli Lust
 Best Comic Strip: Totes Meer, by 18 Metzger
 Best German-language Comic/Comic-related Publication:
 Domestic: Kinderland, by 
 Import: Billy Bat, by Naoki Urasawa & Takashi Nagasaki (Carlsen Verlag)
 For Children and Young People: Hilda and the Midnight Giant, by Luke Pearson
 Art school project: Triebwerk
 Prize Awarded by the Audience: Schisslaweng, by Marvin Clifford
 Special Prize of the Jury: Tina Hohl and Heinrich Anders, for the German translation of Jimmy Corrigan, the Smartest Kid on Earth
 Special Prize for outstanding life's work: Ralf König

2016 
 Best German-language Comic Artist: 
 Best Comic Strip: Das Hochhaus, by 
 Best German-language Comic/Comic-related Publication:
 Domestic: Madgermanes, by Birgit Weyhe (avant-verlag)
 Import: This One Summer, by Jillian Tamaki & Mariko Tamaki
 For Children and Young People: Kiste, by  & 
 Art school project: Wunderfitz
 Prize Awarded by the Audience: Crash 'n' Burn, by Mikiko Ponczeck (Tokyopop)
 Special Prize of the Jury: avant-verlag
 Special Prize of the Jury: Luz, for Catharsis (S. Fischer Verlag)
 Special Prize for outstanding life's work: Claire Bretécher

2018 
 Best German-language Comic Artist: Reinhard Kleist
 Best Comic Strip: Das Leben ist kein Ponyhof by Sarah Burrini
 Best German-language Comic/Comic-related Publication:
 Domestic: Wie ich versuchte, ein guter Mensch zu sein by Ulli Lust, Suhrkamp Verlag
 Import: Esthers Tagebücher (Esther's notebooks) by Riad Sattouf, Reprodukt
 For Children and Young People: Die drei ??? – Das Dorf der Teufel (comic book adaptation from the Three Investigators) by Ivar Leon Menger, John Beckmann and Christopher Tauber, Kosmos (publisher)
 Art school project: Paradies curated by Jonathan Kunz (Hochschule der Bildenden Künste Saar)
 Prize Awarded by the Audience: NiGuNeGu by Oliver Mielke and Hannes Radke, Pyramond
 Special Prize of the Jury: Paul Derouet
 Special Prize for outstanding life's work: Jean-Claude Mézières

2022
 Lifetime Achievement Award: Naoki Urasawa

References

External links
Max und Moritz Award, Erlangen International Comic Salon

Comics awards
Erlangen